Charles Henry Henneman (February 15, 1866 – June 23, 1938) was an American track and field athlete who competed in the 1904 Summer Olympics. Born in Iowa, in 1904 he was finished fourth in 56 pound weight throw competition.

References

External links
Charles Hennemann. Sports Reference. Retrieved 2019-08-17.
list of American athletes 

1866 births
1938 deaths
American male shot putters
Male weight throwers
American male discus throwers
Olympic weight throwers
Olympic track and field athletes of the United States
Athletes (track and field) at the 1904 Summer Olympics
Track and field athletes from Iowa